José María "Txema" Portillo Valdés (born 1961) is a Spanish historian, professor of Contemporary History at the University of the Basque Country. He is an expert in the Spanish constitutional history.

Biography 
Born in 1961. He earned a PhD in History from the University of the Basque Country (UPV/EHU), reading a dissertation in 1990 titled Monarquía y Gobierno Provincial. On 13 February 1998, he was one of the founders of the Foro Ermua. A lecturer at the UPV/EHU since 1988, he was subject to harassment and threats coming from the environment of ETA, as well as an attempted attack in the Vitoria Campus where he worked, as an incendiary artifact was put in his car in October 1999. He was appointed to a Chair in Contemporary History at the UPV/EHU in 2017.

Works 

Author
 
 
 
 
 
 
 
Co-author

Decorations 
 Medal of the Order of the Constitutional Merit (2003)

References 
Citations

Bibliography
 
 
 
 
 
 
 
 
 

1961 births
Historians of Spain
Living people
Recipients of the Order of Constitutional Merit
20th-century Spanish historians
Euskadiko Ezkerra politicians
Academic staff of the University of the Basque Country
21st-century Spanish historians